Buffalo is a ghost town in Alberta, Canada.

The community is located in census division No. 4 and in the federal riding of Medicine Hat. It is administered by Special Area No. 2.

See also
List of ghost towns in Alberta
List of communities in Alberta

References

Localities in Special Area No. 2
Ghost towns in Alberta